Nicholas Dean is an American diplomat and former Ambassador to the Bangladesh. He served as the special envoy for Holocaust of the state department.

Early life
Dean earned a B.A.in History from the University of Virginia. He also went to graduate school in the University of Virginia.

Career
Dean served in the United States Embassy to Georgia as the Acting Deputy Chief of Mission and Political-Economic Counselor. He was the Energy Officer in the United States Embassy to Russia. He served in the United States Embassy in Australia as the Commercial Office. He was the German desk officer in Washington D.C. at the State Department. He served in Leipzig, Germany as the Principal Staff Officer. In September 2003, he was appointed the deputy director of the State Department's Office of India, Nepal, Sri Lanka, Maldives and Bhutan Affairs. In 2011, he served as the Chargé d'Affaires of the US embassy to Bangladesh based in Dhaka. As the head of the US mission to Bangladesh, he called on the Bangladesh government to deploy troops to Afghanistan.

Dean served as the Special Envoy for Holocaust Issues under President Barack Obama. He served as the Director of Australia, New Zealand and Pacific Island Affairs in the Bureau of East Asia and Pacific Affairs of the U.S. Department of State. He served in the White House as the Senior Director for South Asia of National Security Staff.

Personal life
Dean is married to a fellow Foreign Service officer.

References

Living people
Ambassadors of the United States to Bangladesh
University of Virginia alumni
Year of birth missing (living people)